The Danish Chess Championship was organised by the Danish Chess Union (DSU) and first held in 1910. A masterclass was first introduced in 1915. But it is only from 1922 that the title of Danish chess champion was introduced, this was the first year also players from Copenhagen joined.

History
In 1949 Poul Hage and Bjørn Nielsen were equal, but Nielsen died before the play-off. In 1950 Hage finished equal with Jens Enevoldsen, but this time the winner was decided by toss up.

The 1997 Championship was a ten-player single round-robin tournament held in Esbjerg from 22–30 March.
The field included six Grandmasters, and the tournament average Elo rating was 2487 making it FIDE category 10.
Lars Bo Hansen won with 6.0/9, and was the only player to not lose a game.
Tied for second at 5.5 were Curt Hansen, Bent Larsen, and Peter Heine Nielsen.
The four top finishers were all GMs.

The 1999 Championship was a ten-player single round-robin tournament held in Aarhus starting on 27 March.
Peter Heine Nielsen and Sune Berg Hansen tied at 6.5/9, with Nielsen winning the championship on tie-break.

The 2000 Championship began as a ten-player single round-robin tournament, but 65-year-old former champion Bent Larsen was forced to withdraw due to ill health, and his completed games were not counted in the tournament results.  The 15–24 April championship in Aalborg was won by Curt Hansen 6.0/8 a half point ahead of Peter Heine Nielsen.  Both completed the tournament without a loss, but Hansen had one more win.

The 2001 Championship was a ten-player single round-robin tournament held in Nyborg from 7–16 April.
Tournament favorite Peter Heine Nielsen won 7.0/9.

The 2002 Championship was a ten-player single round-robin tournament held in Greve from 23–31 March.
Sune Berg Hansen won 6.5/9.

The 2003 Championship was a ten-player single round-robin tournament held in Horsens from 12–20 April.
Tournament favorite Peter Heine Nielsen won 7.0/9, a half point ahead of Palo Davor in second place.

The 2004 Championship was a 16-player single-elimination tournament held in Køge, 4–12 April.  Steffen Pedersen defeated Henrik El Kher in the final to win the championship.

The 2005 Championship was a 16-player single-elimination tournament held in Køge, 20–28 March.  Sune Berg Hansen defeated Curt Hansen 2.5–1.5 in the final to win the championship.

The 2006 Championship, held 8–17 April in Aalborg, was organized as a ten-player single round-robin Gladiator Chess event in which only games won would count.  In order to reduce the number of draws, any drawn games were replayed at with colors reversed at rapid time controls of 25 minutes + 10 seconds per move.  A series of draws would be replayed with colors reversed each time at blitz speed, 10 minutes + 5 seconds per move until a decisive result was achieved.  The use of the gladiator scoring did not affect the top two finishes in the championship.  Sune Berg Hansen placed first and Nicolai Vesterbaek Pedersen second in a field of ten.

The 2007 Championship was a 24-player, 9-round Swiss system tournament held in Aalborg, 31 March–8 April.  Sune Berg Hansen defended his title winning for the third consecutive time (four championships overall), 6.5/9.  As part of a four-way tie for second with 6 points, FM Allan Stig Rasmussen missed earning his second grandmaster norm by only a half point.

The 2008 Championship was a 20-player, 9-round Swiss held in Silkeborg, 15–23 March.  Peter Heine Nielsen won scoring 7 points in the first championship he had entered in five years.  Lars Schandorff was second with 6 points.  Defending champion Sune Berg Hansen shared third with 5½.

Winners

{| class="sortable wikitable"
! Year !! City !! Winner
|-
| 1910 || Randers       || Johannes Kruse
|-
| 1911 || Odense        || Gyde Jørgensen
|-
| 1912 || Lemvig        || M. Weye
|-
| 1913 || Slagelse      || Age Kier
|-
| 1914 || Aarhus        || Axel Salskov
|-
| 1915 || Horsens       || Johannes Giersing
|-
| 1916 || Copenhagen    || J. Juhl
|-
| 1917 || Grenaa        || Egil Jacobsen
|-
| 1918 || Nykøbing      || Liss Olof Karlsson
|-
| 1919 || Middelfart    || Frederik Immanuel Weilbach
|-
| 1920 || Aalborg       || Johannes Petersen  Hans Denver
|-
| 1921 || Roskilde      || F. Thomsen
|-
| 1922 || Copenhagen    || Egil Jacobsen
|-
| 1923 || Copenhagen    || Erik Andersen
|-
| 1924 || Randers       || Age Kier
|-
| 1925 || Aarhus        || Erik Andersen
|-
| 1926 || Sønderborg    || Erik Andersen
|-
| 1927 || Vordingborg   || Erik Andersen
|-
| 1928 || Horsens       || Jacob Erhard Wihjelm Gemzøe
|-
| 1929 || Copenhagen    || Erik Andersen
|-
| 1930 || Svendborg     || Erik Andersen
|-
| 1931 || Frederikshavn || Erik Andersen
|-
| 1932 || Esbjerg       || Erik Andersen
|-
| 1933 || Nakskov       || Erik Andersen
|-
| 1934 || Vejle         || Erik Andersen
|-
| 1935 || Copenhagen    || Erik Andersen
|-
| 1936 || Herning       || Erik Andersen
|-
| 1937 || Odense        || Poul Hage
|-
| 1938 || Aalborg       || Poul Hage
|-
| 1939 || Naestved      || Holger Norman-Hansen
|-
| 1940 || Randers       || Jens Enevoldsen
|-
| 1941 || Copenhagen    || Bjørn Nielsen
|-
| 1942 || Nørresundby   || Bjørn Nielsen
|-
| 1943 || Helsingør     || Jens Enevoldsen
|-
| 1944 || Odense        || Bjørn Nielsen
|-
| 1945 || Odense        || Christian Poulsen
|-
| 1946 || Nykøbing      || Bjørn Nielsen
|-
| 1947 || Esbjerg       || Jens Enevoldsen
|-
| 1948 || Aarhus        || Jens Enevoldsen
|-
| 1949 || Copenhagen    || Poul Hage
|-
| 1950 || Aalborg       || Poul Hage
|-
| 1951 || Odense        || Eigil Pedersen
|-
| 1952 || Herning       || Christian Poulsen
|-
| 1953 || Horsens       || Eigil Pedersen
|-
| 1954 || Aarhus        || Bent Larsen
|-
| 1955 || Aalborg       || Bent Larsen
|-
| 1956 || Copenhagen    || Bent Larsen
|-
| 1957 || Odense        || Palle Ravn
|-
| 1958 || Herning       || Børge Andersen
|-
| 1959 || Aarhus        || Bent Larsen
|-
| 1960 || Aalborg       || Jens Enevoldsen
|-
| 1961 || Nykøbing      || Eigil Pedersen
|-
| 1962 || Copenhagen    || Bent Kølvig
|-
| 1963 || Odense        || Bent Larsen
|-
| 1964 || Holstebro     || Bent Larsen
|-
| 1965 || Aalborg       || Sejer Holm
|-
| 1966 || Aarhus        || Bjørn Brinck-Claussen
|-
| 1967 || Vejle         || Børge Andersen
|-
| 1968 || Copenhagen    || Børge Andersen
|-
| 1969 || Odense        || Ole Jakobsen
|-
| 1970 || Flensborg     || Bjørn Brinck-Claussen
|-
| 1971 || Hjørring      || Ole Jakobsen
|-
| 1972 || Esbjerg       || Svend Hamann
|-
| 1973 || Copenhagen    || Børge Andersen
|-
| 1974 || Vejle         || Ulrik Rath
|-
| 1975 || Odense        || Gert Iskov
|-
| 1976 || Aarhus        || Bo Jacobsen
|-
| 1977 || Copenhagen    || Bjørn Brinck-Claussen
|-
| 1978 || Horsens       || Carsten Høi
|-
| 1979 || Aalborg       || Jens Kristiansen
|-
| 1980 || Odense        || Ole Jakobsen
|-
| 1981 || Aarhus        || Erling Mortensen
|-
| 1982 || Vejle         || Jens Kristiansen
|-
| 1983 || Copenhagen    || Curt Hansen
|-
| 1984 || Aalborg       || Curt Hansen
|-
| 1985 || Naestved      || Curt Hansen
|-
| 1986 || Esbjerg       || Carsten Høi
|-
| 1987 || Holstebro     ||  Erling Mortensen
|-
| 1988 || Odense        ||  Lars Schandorff
|-
| 1989 || Aalborg       ||  Erling Mortensen
|-
| 1990 || Randers       || Erik Pedersen
|-
| 1991 || Lyngby        || Erling Mortensen
|-
| 1992 || Aarhus        || Carsten Høi
|-
| 1993 || Tønder        || Lars Bo Hansen
|-
| 1994 || Aalborg       || Curt Hansen
|-
| 1995 || Ringsted      || Jens Kristiansen
|-
| 1996 || Randers       || Peter Heine Nielsen
|-
| 1997 || Esbjerg       || Lars Bo Hansen
|-
| 1998 || Taastrup      || Curt Hansen
|-
| 1999 || Aarhus        || Peter Heine Nielsen
|-
| 2000 || Aalborg       || Curt Hansen
|-
| 2001 || Nyborg        || Peter Heine Nielsen
|-
| 2002 || Greve         || Sune Berg Hansen
|-
| 2003 || Horsens       || Peter Heine Nielsen 
|-
| 2004 || Køge          || Steffen Pedersen
|-
| 2005 || Køge          || Sune Berg Hansen
|-
| 2006 || Aalborg       || Sune Berg Hansen
|-
| 2007 || Aalborg       || Sune Berg Hansen
|-
| 2008 || Silkeborg     || Peter Heine Nielsen
|-
| 2009 || Silkeborg     || Sune Berg Hansen
|-
| 2010 || Hillerød      || Allan Stig Rasmussen
|-
| 2011 || Odense        || Allan Stig Rasmussen
|-
| 2012 || Helsingør     || Sune Berg Hansen
|-
| 2013 || Helsingør     || Davor Palo
|-
| 2014 || Skørping      || Allan Stig Rasmussen
|-
| 2015 || Svendborg      || Sune Berg Hansen
|-
| 2016 || Svendborg      || Mads Andersen
|-
| 2017 || Skørping      || Mads Andersen
|-
| 2018 || Svendborg      || Bjørn Møller Ochsner
|-
| 2019 || Svendborg      || Allan Stig Rasmussen
|-
|2020
|Svendborg
|Mads Andersen
|}

Notes

References
Results from the Danish Chess Federation (DCF) 
Cities from the Danish Chess Federation (DCF)
History of Danish chess
List of Danish Champions
 Jerzy Gizycki (1965), Den Store skakbog. Skakkens kulturhistorie. 
 (results through 1985)
1997 Croanishsstable and round-by-round results  at chess.gr

Chess national championships
Chess in Denmark
1910 in chess
1910 establishments in Denmark
Awards established in 1910